The Treatise of the Three Impostors was a long-rumored book denying all three Abrahamic religions: Christianity, Judaism, and Islam, with the "impostors" of the title being Jesus, Moses, and Muhammad. Hearsay concerning such a book surfaces by the 13th century and circulates through the 17th century. Authorship of the hoax book was variously ascribed to Jewish, Muslim, and Christian writers. Fabrications of the text eventually begin clandestine circulation, with a notable French underground edition Traité sur les trois imposteurs first appearing in 1719.

Timeline of the myth

Traité sur les trois imposteurs, from 1719
The work that came to be known by this name was published in the early eighteenth century. There were eight published editions, from 1719 to 1793. There was also clandestine circulation. The Traité sur les trois imposteurs has been reckoned the most important example of the underground literature in French of the period.

The work purported to be a text handed down from generation to generation. It can be traced to the circle around Prosper Marchand, who included Jean Aymon and Jean Rousset de Missy. It detailed how the three major figures of Biblical religion in fact misrepresented what had happened to them.

According to Silvia Berti, the book was originally published as La Vie et L'Esprit de Spinosa (The Life and Spirit of Spinoza), containing both a biography of Benedict Spinoza and the anti-religious essay, and was later republished under the title Traité sur les trois imposteurs. The creators of the book have been identified by documentary evidence as  Jean Rousset de Missy and the bookseller Charles Levier. The author of the book may have been a young Dutch diplomat called Jan Vroesen or Vroese. Another candidate, to whom Levier attributed the work, is Jean-Maximilien Lucas. Israel places its composition in the 1680s.

The content of the Traité has been traced primarily to Spinoza, but with subsequent additions drawn from the ideas of Pierre Charron, Thomas Hobbes, François de La Mothe Le Vayer, Gabriel Naudé and Lucilio Vanini. The reconstruction of the group of authors, given the original text, goes as far as Levier and others such as Aymon and Rousset de Missy. An account based on the testimony of the brother of the publisher Caspar Fritsch, an associate of Marchand, has Levier in 1711 borrowing the original text from Benjamin Furly.

Events from 1719

As trope
It has been suggested that the "three impostors" as trope can be seen as the negative form of the "ring parable", as used in Lessing's Nathan the Wise.

References

Further reading

External links
 Full Text of Müller's De Tribus Impostoribus provided by infidels.org
 Müller's Tribus Impostoribus in the original Latin, provided by Bibliotheca Augustana (archive)
 Bio on Friedrick II -- subheading "Struggle with the papacy." (3/5ths of the way down the page) from the Encyclopædia Britannica

Books critical of religion
Literary forgeries
Treatises